Kyiv Islamic Cultural Centre (from 2001) – mosque and cultural organization in Kyiv, Ukraine. Islamic Cultural Centre (ICC) of Kyiv is one of the nine cultural centers located in the biggest cities of Ukraine. The building of ICC hosted the office of Religious Administration of Muslims of Ukraine “Ummah”, Ukrainian Centre for Islamic Studies, Shariah Committee, right protection organization Together with the law, Alraid Halal Certification and Research Center, publishing office Ansar Foundation, gymnasium Our Future, public organizations Mariam and An-Nur, head office of AUASO Alraid.

Infrastructure of ICC 

In two prayer's halls of ICC – men's and women's, which can contain approximately 1500 people - Daily and Friday Prayers are held. Circles of Quran reading (tajwid) and memorizing Quran, lection about the basis of Islam (fiqh, sīra, etc.) open for Muslims. During the holy month, Ramadan, in ICC people gather for iftar every evening. Eid al-Fitr and Eid al-Adha are celebrated solemnly and joyously with entertaining program for children.

In the center for women's development in ICC workshops for personal development, classes and lections dedicated to different topics, including family psychology, are often took place.  Moreover, women have an opportunity to attend sewing and cooking circles, fitness classes.

ICC courses of Arabic language and Islamic culture are held using special developed program. Native speakers teach students using specially developed program.

Activity 

Main spheres of activity of ICC include promoting interreligious and intercultural dialog, spreading truthful information about Islam, breaking the myths about Islam and Muslims, and enriching of knowledge of Ukrainian Muslims.

Educational activity 

From 2014 gymnasium Our Future have functioned in ICC. This is a private educational institution for primary and secondary school education, operating within the authority mandated by a state license. School use national educational standard. Using following link you can do virtual excursion to the gymnasium.

Public activity 

In Islamic Cultural Centre of Kyiv “East Fest” was held on August 23, 2015 and May 14, 2016. That event wasn't a simple demonstration of Eastern traditions, but a link between representatives of different nations in our country.

On December 19, 2015 Islamic Cultural Centre of Kyiv hosted International Quran Recital Competition between representatives of Ukraine, post-soviet countries, near and far abroad countries. Altogether 56 participants took part in the competition; including one participant from Crimea and one from occupied Donbas area.

During July 20–24, 2015 our capital had hosted 4th International School for Islamic studies organized by AUASO Alraid and RAMU Ummah. It was dedicated actual questions of modern age. During 5 working days participants worked on searching for identity, dialog, conflict solving and extremism.
 
In ICC of Kyiv activists of public women's Muslim organization Mariam organized the Day of Ukrainian Culture on December 26, 2016. Quests learned about Ukrainian traditions, particularly women's role in Ukrainian society today and in historical aspect, traditions accompanying girl's life from her birth to motherhood. After tasting halal Ukrainian dishes, prepared by activists of Mariam, everybody could join the master class of Petrykivsky painting.

See also 
 Islam in Ukraine
 List of mosques in Europe

References

Islam in Ukraine
Religious buildings and structures in Kyiv
Mosques in Kyiv